is a former Japanese football player.

Playing career
Hiratsuka was born in Saitama Prefecture on December 2, 1979. He joined J1 League club Bellmare Hiratsuka (later Shonan Bellmare) in 1998. Although he played several matches as midfielder every season, he could not play many matches. The club was also relegated to J2 League from 2000. In 2001, he moved to Japan Football League club Jatco TT (later Jatco). He played many matches until 2003 season. However the club was disbanded at the end of the 2003 season and he retired at the same time.

Club statistics

References

External links

1979 births
Living people
Association football people from Saitama Prefecture
Japanese footballers
J1 League players
J2 League players
Japan Football League players
Shonan Bellmare players
Jatco SC players
Association football midfielders